In probability theory, Maxwell's theorem, named in honor of James Clerk Maxwell, states that if the probability distribution of a vector-valued random variable X = ( X1, ..., Xn )T is the same as the distribution of GX for every n×n orthogonal matrix G and the components are independent, then the components X1, ..., Xn are normally distributed with expected value 0 and all have the same variance.  This theorem is one of many characterizations of the normal distribution.

Since a multiplication by an orthogonal matrix is a rotation, the theorem says that if the probability distribution of a random vector is unchanged by rotations and if the components are independent, then the components are identically distributed and normally distributed.  In other words, the only rotationally invariant probability distributions on Rn that have independent components are multivariate normal distributions with expected value 0 and variance σ2In, (where In = the n×n identity matrix), for some positive number σ2.

References

Probability theorems
James Clerk Maxwell